Plus 2 Radio is a defunct national private radio station operating in Albania. Also, a part of BMN, a local radio network made up of 7 radio stations broadcasting in the Albanian speaking territories of the Balkans.

References 

Radio stations in Albania

Defunct mass media in Albania 
Radio stations established in 1998